Microbulbifer is a genus of bacteria found in high-salt environments. Members of this genus can degrade complex carbohydrates such as cellulose, alginate, and chitin. Recently, Microbulbifer degredans was renamed Saccharophagus degredans.

Etymology 
Microbulbifer (Mi.cro. bul’bi.fer. Gr. adj. micro, small; L. m. n. bulbus, onion, bulb; L. suff. -fer, carrying, bearing; L. m. n. Microbulbifer, small bearer of bulbs).

References 

Alteromonadales
Bacteria genera